The Labor Order is an award conferred or posthumously conferred by the Government of Vietnam on individuals and conferred on collectives that have recorded outstanding achievements in labor, creativity or national construction. There are three Labour Order awards. The basic award is the 3rd class which has one star, the 2nd class award has two stars and the highest 1st class award has three stars.

Criteria

The Labor Order may be conferred or posthumously conferred on individuals who satisfy one of the following criteria:

 Having been conferred the second-class Labor Order and then the National Emulation Fighter title.
 Having inventions, scientific works or outstanding works of the State level;
 Having recorded unexpected exceptionally outstanding achievements or a long process of devotion in agencies, organizations or mass organizations.

It also be conferred on collectives which satisfy one of the following criteria:

 Having been conferred the second-class Labor Order, then the Excellent Labor Collective or Determined-to-Win Unit title for the subsequent five consecutive years, and the Emulation Flag of the ministerial-, branch-. provincial- or central mass organization-level for three times or the Government's Emulation Flag twice;
 Having recorded unexpected exceptionally outstanding achievements.

Recipients 
 Dominic Scriven
 Mirosław Żuławski
 Võ Thị Thắng
 Park Hang-seo
 Le Quy Don High School for the Gifted

See also 
 Vietnam awards and decorations

References

Orders, decorations, and medals of Vietnam
Military awards and decorations of Vietnam
Awards established in 1950
1950 establishments in Vietnam